Knocklyon is a suburb of Dublin in county of South Dublin, within the old County Dublin, Ireland. Unlike many Dublin suburbs, Knocklyon was not developed around a village; rather it largely comprises modern housing built between the village of Templeogue and the former hamlet, now a suburb in its own right, of Firhouse. A number of old cottages and farmhouses along Knocklyon Road attest to the area's rural past.

Etymology 
The area has been known historically in 14th-century scrolls as Cnoclín, literally 'flax mountain'. Until recently, roadsigns in Knocklyon had an incorrect "reverse anglicised" translation, giving Lyon's hill or Cnoc Liamhna, so for example, the Irish-language wording on signs for Knocklyon Road showed Bóthar Chnoc Liamhna. The local authority have updated their translation based on recommendations from the commissioned update on Irish placenames.

Location 
Knocklyon is located among the southwestern suburbs of the city, in the foothills of the Dublin Mountains and south of the line of the River Dodder. It is bordered to the east and south by Rathfarnham, to the north by Templeogue, and to the west by Firhouse and Ballycullen.

The M50 motorway divides Knocklyon, with most of the suburb lying east of the motorway. Housing estates to the east include Idrone, Knocklyon Avenue, Beverly, Dargle Wood, Coolamber, Knockcullen, Lansdowne, Delaford, Knockaire, Orlagh, Scholarstown Park, Woodfield and Templeroan. To the west of the M50 are estates such as Castlefield, Glenlyon, Monalea, Glenvara and Woodstown. The western and eastern portions of the suburb are linked by the Firhouse Road, by the flyover at Junction 12 of the M50 motorway, and by a footbridge close to where the Old Knocklyon Road formerly met Ballycullen Road.

Population 
The population figure cannot be isolated from published census data as Knocklyon is composed of Firhouse-Knocklyon electoral division (ED) (population 39,602 in 2011), plus fractions of Ballyboden ED (57,085) and Firhouse-Ballycullen ED (77,773), not divided and published distinctly.

Amenities 

Knocklyon Shopping Centre contains a supermarket and other retail outlets. There are also two shopping areas in the Orlagh and Woodstown estates. Both are anchored by a supermarket and have a number of fast food takeaway shops, as well as beauty salons and childcare centres. There is also a local public house.

A division of the St. John Ambulance was established in 2010 which provides first aid training in the community.

Knocklyon has a number of open spaces within its residential estates and along the River Dodder, including the home ground and playing pitches for both a Gaelic Athletic Association club (Ballyboden St. Enda's GAA) and a football club, Knocklyon United Football Club.

Schools 

St. Colmcille's national school opened in September 1976. The school is the largest primary school in Ireland and one of the largest primary schools in Europe and educates 1,600 students and employs 80 teachers, 23 special needs assistants, and 11 ancillary staff.

Gaelscoil Chnoc Liamhna is an Irish language primary school that was established in September 1996 with 36 pupils. The school now teaches 234 children.

St. Colmcille's Community School (formerly Knocklyon Community School) has 700 secondary students and opened in September 2000.

Prior to the construction of Knocklyon Community School the area was (and to some extent still is) served by Templeogue College, Terenure College, Sancta Maria College, Saint Mac Dara's, Firhouse Community School , Our Lady's Secondary School and Coláiste Éanna C.B.S.

Religion 
The Catholic Parish of Knocklyon was established in October 1974 under the patronage of Saint Colmcille. It is run for the Dublin Archdiocese by the Carmelite Order. The parish church opened in April 1980, with the Iona Pastoral Centre formally opened in 2000.

Anglican Church of Ireland Knocklyon residents are members of the Rathfarnham Church of Ireland.

The Knocklyon Church of Christ is an autonomous Christian congregation on Knocklyon Road, near Gaelscoil Chnoc Liamhna.

Transport 
Knocklyon is served by Dublin Bus routes 15,15b, 49, 65b, 75 and 175.

Sport and leisure 
The Gaelic Athletic Association (GAA) is represented in Knocklyon by Ballyboden St. Enda's GAA Club. Association football is organised by Knocklyon United F.C.

The local Brothers Pearse Athletics Club was founded in 1956.

There is a branch of Scouting Ireland and the South Dublin Model Railway Club, which have their own premises.

References

External links 

St. Colmcille's Community School
Knocklyon Parish

Towns and villages in South Dublin (county)
Places in South Dublin (county)